Texan English is the array of American English dialects spoken in Texas, primarily falling under Southern U.S. English. As one nationwide study states, the typical Texan accent is a "Southern accent with a twist". The "twist" refers to inland Southern U.S., older coastal Southern U.S., and South Midland U.S. accents mixing together, due to Texas's settlement history, as well as some lexical (vocabulary) influences from Mexican Spanish. In fact, there is no single accent that covers all of Texas and few dialect features are unique to Texas alone. The newest and most innovative Southern U.S. accent features are best reported in Lubbock, Odessa, somewhat Houston and variably Dallas, though general features of this same dialect are found throughout the state, with several exceptions: Abilene and somewhat Austin, Corpus Christi, and El Paso appear to align more with Midland U.S. accents than Southern ones.

History
After Mexico gained independence in 1821, Mexican Texas legally permitted an influx of American settlers from the United States (mainly the Southern United States), who within a decade outnumbered Hispanics in Texas, making English as common as Spanish in central and north Texas. After Texas became an independent republic in 1836, English, with its distinct Southern influences, became the predominant language. After the Mexican Revolution of 1910-1920, a great number of Spanish-speaking Mexicans immigrated to Texas, slowing down in the mid-20th century only to increase massively since 1990, driving the development of a young Spanish-influenced dialect of Texan English: Tejano English.

Research
Some linguists draw dialect boundaries based upon phonological (sound-pattern) differences and others on lexical (word-usage) differences, leading to various views on how to classify dialects in Texas, often by dividing the state into an eastern versus a western dialect region. 20th-century lexical research delimited Texas into two "layers": a southern Texas layer along the Mexican border with several Spanish loanwords and a central Texas layer settled by speakers of German and other European languages amidst a dominant Anglo-American settlement. 21st-century phonological research reveals accents in Texas grouped in a way not easy to demarcate in terms of simple geographical boundaries, and ongoing research reveals an urban–rural divide within Texas becoming more significant than a region-wide divide.

Some linguists propose that urbanization, geographic and social mobility, and the mass media have homogenized the speech of the United States to a national norm. Due to rapid urbanization, increasing dominance of high tech industries, and massive migrations, Texan speech has been reshaped as well, especially since 1990. The general tendency in the phonology of Texas English is that mergers expand at the expense of distinctions, although traditional Southern-style Texan English preserved older phonemic distinctions. Since much of the traditional regional vocabulary concerned farming and rural life, these terms are now disappearing or being replaced by technical terms.

Urban–rural contrast
As stated above, an internal rural–urban split is emerging within Texan English, meaning that most traditionally Southern (or stereotypically Texan) features remain strong in rural areas but tend to disappear in large urban areas and small cities. The urban-rural linguistic split mainly affects Southern-style phonological phenomena like the pen-pin merger, the loss of the offglide in /aɪ/, and upgliding diphthongs, all of which are now recessive in metropolitan areas. Meanwhile, some traditional grammatical features like y'all and fixin' to are expanding to non-natives in metropolitan areas as well as to the Hispanic population.

Phonology

Essentially all Texas English phonologically falls under the Southeastern super-dialect region of the United States and often specifically the Southern dialect region, though noticeably not the cities of El Paso, Abilene, and Austin, and not particularly Houston and Corpus Christi. Moreover, as of 21st-century research, the accents of Dallas show enormous variability.
Of the three possible stages of the Southern Vowel Shift, the first two stages occur throughout Texas, except in El Paso, Abilene, Austin, and Corpus Christi—the first stage alone appears in Houston.
A study of Texas Triangle English shows a strong orientation of primarily young, female, and urban speakers towards a diphthongization of /aɪ/ in all contexts. In fact, the monophthongization of /aɪ/ has left Texas Triangle speech almost entirely. 89% of the speakers born in the 1980s use diphthongal realizations of /aɪ/, whereas only 11% use monophthongal or intermediate realizations of /aɪ/.
The ANAE reports a completed merger in Amarillo, Odessa, and variably El Paso, but the rest of Texas is also rapidly transitioning towards the merger.
A few younger speakers realize the  vowel , unlike typical Southerners, as open front , which is more in line with the Western U.S. dialect. This lowering occurs only in speakers with the cot-caught merger, and is not yet as common as in California and Canada.
Three mergers before /l/ are recorded in some Texas English: the fill–feel merger (most concentrated from the Panhandle down to San Antonio), the fell–fail merger, and the full–fool merger.
Non-rhoticity has reversed on a massive scale, as in most of the Southern U.S., and is now only heard in some older speakers.

Grammar

Texas English may use many grammatical constructions typically associated with Southern U.S. English, including fixin' to, multiple modals like might could and should oughta (reportedly used by every social class and, as of the 1980s Linguistic Atlas of the Gulf States, predominately in Upper and Lower East Texas), and plural verbal -s as in Our father and mother helps used by both black and (somewhat less commonly) white Texans.

Vocabulary
Many of these lexical terms are shared with the Midland and Southern dialects generally:
buzzard: vulture
blue norther: The term blue norther refers to a weather phenomenon that often appears in the temperate zones all over the world (including Texas). It is a quickly moving autumnal cold front which drops the temperatures rapidly and brings along rain and after a period of blue skies and cold weather. The derivation of this term is unclear. Some people say that the term refers to a norther (borealis/north wind) which sweeps "out of the Panhandle under a blue-black sky" – from the heat to the blue black cold. Others suggest that blue norther denotes the color of the sky that appears after the bad weather front has passed. Yet others say that people associate blue with the cold that the front brings along. Variants of this term are blue whistler, blue darter and blue blizzard. Whereas the term blue whistler is also used in Texas the two latter terms are from out of state. Blue norther, however, is purely Texan. Since Spanish times, the effect of blue norther has been noted in Texas and this phenomenon has often been exaggerated. But contrary to the belief of many people, blue norther is not unique to Texas.
bowie knife: a long hunting knife (pronounced boo-ee). Named for Alamo hero Jim Bowie.
dogie: calf.
fixin' to: a future-tense modal verb analogous to "about to" or "going to" in much of American English. E.g., "I'm fixin' to leave for school."
geddup: outfit (clothing) ["get up" but pronounced with accent meaning an outfit or costume typically meaning an exceptional context and may be negative or positive connotation]
howdy: a general greeting; a shortened form of "How do you do?"
looker: an attractive woman
maverick: stray or unbranded.
motte (mot): The term motte or mot refers to a small grove of trees in open grasslands. It was first introduced by Irish immigrants in the 1830s. They brought this term from Ireland where people used to call similar woods this way. In the United States one hears of motte only in Texas.
plumb: superlative adjective, equivalent to "absolutely" or "very much". E.g., "He's plumb out of luck."
pole cat: a skunk
shinnery: a well-known term in western Texas for a shinnery oak or a sand shinnery oak. These trees grow in Texas, western Oklahoma, and eastern New Mexico. The term shinnery can also mean the area or landscape in which shinnery oaks grow.
spindletop: a gushing oil well
tank: stock pond.
varmint: a wild or rascally animal, especially a mammal (sometimes used endearingly). Derivative of vermin. 
y'all: a second-person plural pronoun; a shortened form of "you all"
(over) yonder: an adverbial used to designate a faraway place; analogous to "over there"

Statewide Spanish loanwords
Due to Spain's past influence in Texas, the vocabulary of Texas is much more influenced by Spanish than the vocabulary of other states. Some of the Texan terms that originated from Spanish are listed below.
: Sometimes grassy strips between two divided highway lanes are called .
: The Spanish word  used to be solely Texan. Not until recently did the term start to expand. Now it is well known in other States of the U.S. and many other countries. It refers to a hot pepper originated from Mexico.
 (from Spanish ): rope or lasso.
 (from Spanish  = to exchange): spare horse or remount; mainly used in West Texas.
It refers to a Hispanic Texan whose heritage is from Texas before Texas was incorporated into the United States. This term also embraces cultural manifestations in language, literature, art, music, cuisine, etc. already in 1824 the author of the Mexican Constitution of 1824, Miguel Ramos Arispe, called the citizens of Texas . After the Mexican War the term  which contains the term  denoted the residents of the Mexican state Coahuila y Tejas. In 1855 when the San Antonio newspaper  reported a letter by José Antonio Navarro read at the second meeting of the Spanish-speaking members of the Bexar County Democratic party the term  first appeared in print.  occurred more often in speech and texts when the political activity of Hispanics in Texas became pronounced, in particular since the Chicano movement of the mid-1960s started. This term is common enough that it is considered an item in the Texas lexicon.

South Texas vocabulary
acequia (from Spanish acequia): an irrigation ditch.
arroyo (from Spanish arroyo): a gulch, ravine, creek bed
caliche (from Spanish caliche): a hardened layer of calcium carbonate in the ground.
chaparral (from Spanish chaparral): brush-covered terrain
frijoles (from Spanish frijol): beans
hacienda (from Spanish hacienda): the main house of a ranch
icehouse: a term used in the San Antonio area to mean a convenience store. Elsewhere, this denotes an open-air tavern, the origin of which dates back to the times when fresh beer was stored in "ice houses" placed strategically along beer delivery routes for local and regional delivery. Over time these locations began to serve cold beer, since it was stored there already, and other conveniences, such as food items, cigarettes, etc. In more modern times, the surviving ice houses are little more than open air beer bars. It is the "open air" feature (often obtained with multiple garage doors in place of walls), in fact, that distinguishes an ice house from a tavern.
llano (from Spanish llano): a plain
olla (from Spanish olla): an earthenware pot or crock
pelado (from Spanish pelado): a catch-all term for low-class and popular-culture people. Now considered an offensive and derogatory word 
pilon (from Spanish pilón): a bonus, lagniappe
reata (from Spanish reata): a rope or lasso
resaca (from Spanish resaca): a small body of water
toro (from Spanish toro): a bull
vaquero (from Spanish vaquero): a cowboy

Central Texas vocabulary
clook, cluck: (from German Glucke) a setting hen
cook cheese, kochcase: (from German Kochkäse = (literally) smearing cheese) a soft cheese cooked and poured into jars
grass sack or gunny sack: a burlap bag
icebox: a refrigerator or freezer (used interchangeably to refer to both)
plunder room: a storage room
roping rope: a lariat
settee: (from settle) a couch or sofa
smearcase: (from German Schmierkäse) cottage cheese
tarviated road: a paved or blacktopped road
tool house: a toolshed
wood house: a woodshed

In the media

Texan English frequently shows up in the media. In the 1950s and 1960s, many Hollywood western movies like Giant, Hud, and The Alamo were set in Texas. In those movies, Hollywood stars like James Dean, Rock Hudson, Dennis Hopper, Paul Newman, and Patricia Neal first had to learn how to speak Texan English and were instructed by native Texans. Also the famous TV series Dallas was often characterized by Texan English.

Texas Instruments sometimes uses Texan English in its products. The TIFORM software for its TI-990 minicomputer sometimes displayed "Shut 'er Down Clancey She's a-Pumping Mud" as a humorous error message.

The Texan accent gained nationwide fame with the presidency of native Texan Lyndon B. Johnson. A lifelong resident of the Texas Hill Country, Johnson's thick accent was a large part of his personality and brought attention and fame to the dialect.

The Texan dialect gained fame again when George W. Bush started to serve as president. He had moved to West Texas at the age of two and has since retained the Texan dialect. Words like America sometimes sounded like "Amur-kah" or even just like "Mur-kah". Former U.S. Secretary of State Rex Tillerson also speaks with a distinctively Texan accent.

Tejano English

Due to hundreds of years of Spanish and later Mexican intermingling, around 6 million (ca. 29%) people in Texas speak Spanish as the first language.
Recent data shows that Spanish is still increasing. Since there are so many Spanish speakers in Texas, Spanish has a high impact on the English dialect spoken in Texas. Many Mexican Americans in Texas speak their own variety of English which has many Spanish features (terms, phonology, etc.), Tejano English, a Chicano English dialect mostly spoken by working-class Mexican Americans. A very distinctive feature of that dialect is the /-t,d/-deletion in words which contain a /t/ or /d/ in the final position.

References

External links
William Labov's webpage
Texas English Linguistics Lab
Texan Translation (KUT Radio)

American English
Dialects of English
Languages of Texas